The 2018–19 Colorado Avalanche season was the 24th operational season and 23rd playing season since the franchise relocated from Quebec prior to the start of the 1995–96 NHL season. As well as the franchise's 40th season in the National Hockey League and 47th season overall.

On April 4, 2019, the Avalanche clinched a playoff spot after a 3–2 overtime win against the Winnipeg Jets. In the playoffs, the Avalanche defeated the Calgary Flames 4–1 in the First Round to secure their first playoff series win since 2008. Their season, however, would come to an end after losing to the San Jose Sharks in seven games in the second round.

Standings

Schedule and results

Preseason
The preseason schedule was published on June 13, 2018.

Regular season
The regular season schedule was released on June 21, 2018.

Playoffs

The Avalanche faced the Calgary Flames in the First Round of the playoffs, and defeated them in five games.

The Avalanche faced the San Jose Sharks in the Second Round of the playoffs, and were defeated in seven games.

Player statistics
Final Stats
Skaters

Goaltenders

†Denotes player spent time with another team before joining the Avalanche. Stats reflect time with the Avalanche only.
‡Denotes player was traded mid-season. Stats reflect time with the Avalanche only.
Bold/italics denotes franchise record.

Transactions
The Avalanche have been involved in the following transactions during the 2018–19 season.

Trades

Free agents

Waivers

Contract terminations

Retirement

Signings

Draft picks

Below are the Colorado Avalanche's selections at the 2018 NHL Entry Draft, which was held on June 22 and 23, 2018, at the American Airlines Center in Dallas, Texas.

Notes:
 The Ottawa Senators' third-round pick went to the Colorado Avalanche as the result of a trade on June 23, 2018, that sent Nashville's second-round pick in 2018 (58th overall) to Pittsburgh in exchange for a fifth-round pick in 2018 (146th overall) and this pick.
 The Pittsburgh Penguins' fifth-round pick went to the Colorado Avalanche as the result of a trade on June 23, 2018, that sent Nashville's second-round pick in 2018 (58th overall) to Pittsburgh in exchange for Ottawa's third-round pick in 2018 (64th overall) and this pick.

References

Colorado Avalanche seasons
Colorado Avalanche
Colorado Avalanche
Colorado Avalanche